The 2017 VisitMyrtleBeach.com 300 was the 27th stock car race of the 2017 NASCAR Xfinity Series season, the first race of the Round of 12, and the sixth iteration of the event. The race was held on Saturday, September 23, 2017, in Sparta, Kentucky, at Kentucky Speedway, a 1.5-mile (2.41 km) tri-oval speedway. The race took the scheduled 200 laps to complete. Tyler Reddick, driving for Chip Ganassi Racing, would dominate the late stages of the race to win his first career NASCAR Xfinity Series victory and his only win of the season. To fill out the podium, Brennan Poole, driving for Chip Ganassi Racing, and Justin Allgaier, driving for JR Motorsports, would finish second and third, respectively.

Background 

Kentucky Speedway is a 1.5-mile (2.4 km) tri-oval speedway in Sparta, Kentucky, which has hosted ARCA, NASCAR and Indy Racing League racing annually since it opened in 2000. The track is currently owned and operated by Speedway Motorsports, Inc. and Jerry Carroll, who, along with four other investors, owned Kentucky Speedway until 2008. The speedway has a grandstand capacity of 117,000. Construction of the speedway began in 1998 and was completed in mid-2000. The speedway has hosted the Gander RV & Outdoors Truck Series, Xfinity Series, IndyCar Series, Indy Lights, and most recently, the NASCAR Cup Series beginning in 2011.

Entry list 

 (R) denotes rookie driver.
 (i) denotes driver who is ineligible for series driver points.

Practice

First practice 
The first practice session was held on Friday, September 22, at 4:00 PM EST. The session would last for 55 minutes.

Second and final practice 
The final practice session, sometimes known as Happy Hour, was held on Friday, September 22, at 6:30 PM EST. The session would last for 55 minutes.

Qualifying 
Qualifying was held on Saturday, September 23, at 5:35 PM EST. Since Kentucky Speedway is under 2 miles (3.2 km) in length, the qualifying system was a multi-car system that included three rounds. The first round was 15 minutes, where every driver would be able to set a lap within the 15 minutes. Then, the second round would consist of the fastest 24 cars in Round 1, and drivers would have 10 minutes to set a lap. Round 3 consisted of the fastest 12 drivers from Round 2, and the drivers would have 5 minutes to set a time. Whoever was fastest in Round 3 would win the pole.

No drivers would fail to qualify.

Full qualifying results

Race results 
Stage 1 Laps: 45

Stage 2 Laps: 45

Stage 3 Laps: 110

Standings after the race 

Drivers' Championship standings

Note: Only the first 12 positions are included for the driver standings.

References 

2017 NASCAR Xfinity Series
NASCAR races at Kentucky Speedway
September 2017 sports events in the United States
2017 in sports in Kentucky